Agnolo Aniello Fiore (15th century) was an Italian sculptor architect of the Renaissance, active in Naples. He trained under Andrea Ciccione. He is also known as Anniello da Fiore.

References

15th-century Italian architects
Architects from Naples
15th-century Italian sculptors
Italian male sculptors
Renaissance architects
Renaissance sculptors
Year of birth unknown
Year of death unknown